The women's marathon event at the 1993 Summer Universiade was held in Buffalo, United States in July 1993.

Results

References

Athletics at the 1993 Summer Universiade
1993 in women's athletics
1993